Hans-Joachim Mars (born 19 February 1926) is a German former sports shooter. He competed in the 300 metre rifle, three positions event at the 1960 Summer Olympics.

References

External links
 
  

1926 births
Possibly living people
German male sport shooters
Olympic shooters of the United Team of Germany
Shooters at the 1960 Summer Olympics